Sebastian Henry Thiel (born 31 August 1990) is a film director, writer and producer.

Career
Thiel's filmmaking career began in 2008, after his dreams of playing professional basketball fell through. He founded the production company Upshot Entertainment, which produces short films and comedy sketches and began releasing his self-produced videos on YouTube. His early work led to an endorsement by Richard Branson, who named Thiel a Virgin Media Pioneer.

In 2012, Thiel was included on the Evening Standard'''s list of the Top 25 under 25 most influential Londoners and his short film Illegal Activity won the Screen Nation Digital award. Thiel's television debut Trap Town'', a documentary that explored the 2011 England riots, was broadcast on London Live in 2014.

In 2017 Thiel directed, wrote and edited, Just a Couple starring his sister, Frieda Thiel, Michael Salami, Weruche Opia and Sean Sagar. The show is broadcast on BBC Three and is produced by Big Talk Productions. Thiel's first season won him numerous awards, such as favourite comedy production at Screen Nation and Debut Writer award at The Debbies   The show's success also landed him on BBC's prestigious new talent hotlist by Idris Elba and Tony hall.

In the UK's black film community, Sebastian would commonly be mentioned as one of the few young black directors that has broken into TV in the recent years.

Thiel is also known for public speaking and sharing his views on creativity and social entrepreneurship In his teenage years he was a student at The School for Social Entrepreneurs. Thiel teamed up with Entrepreneur Paul Lindley OBE and Musician Emmanuel Jal on a documentary focussed on Social entrepreneurship in Kenya, this was discussed at One Young World. Thiel's company was also the recipient of the iDEA award presented at Buckingham palace, which helped him take his business to the next step. In Thiel's TedxTalks he expressed how important entertainment is as a tool for change. His beliefs are that we should be aware of what we create, specifically when it comes to filmmaking. Thiel's focus on social issues has mainly been on helping disenfranchised young people.

In 2019 John Boyega teased his new collaboration with Sebastian Thiel on Vice and Timeout It's a series based on their childhoods. Thiel is signed with WME in Los Angeles  and 42 in the UK.

Filmography 
 Illegal Activity (2012)
 Friday UK (2012)
 Fill Me In (2013) 
 Adots Apprentice (2013)
 Trap Town (2014) 
 The Key (2015) 
Just a Couple (2017)
Dreaming Whilst Black (2021) 
Riches (2022) 
Supacell

External links

References 

1990 births
Living people
British filmmakers
British writers
British directors